Scaptesyle bizone is a moth in the subfamily Arctiinae. It was described by Rothschild in 1912. It is found in New Guinea.

References

Natural History Museum Lepidoptera generic names catalog

Moths described in 1912
Lithosiini